The XP-class lifeboat is a class of small inflatable rescue boat operated by the RNLI of the United Kingdom and Ireland. 

The XP-class lifeboat is mainly used as a small tender carried onboard RNLI all-weather lifeboats, and is based on the commercially available Avon Rover 280.

It carries a crew of one or two, and is normally found carried on board the Trent-class lifeboat. It is used primarily for assisting in cliff incidents where the casualty is near the water, and where rocks prevent the all-weather lifeboat from getting near the base of the cliff.

The XP was also in use at South Broads Lifeboat Station in Suffolk, one of the few RNLI inland waterways lifeboat stations until it closed in 2011, and at Teignmouth Lifeboat Station in Devon, where it is deployed from the larger  lifeboat.

Other small boats operated by the RNLI include the Arancia-class beach rescue boats, the X-class and the Y-class lifeboats.

References

External links 
RNLI Fleet

Royal National Lifeboat Institution lifeboats
Inflatable boats